Lords of Destiny was a play-by-mail game created by Maelstrom Games in the early 1990s. It was a "low to moderately complex" game of space conquest for twelve players involving characters, fleets and space battle. The game also injected humor into its turn results, and involved "moderate diplomacy" and "minimal time demands" for players. Normal games lasted between 25 and 29 turns, randomly determined by a computer.

Development
As of 1993, Lords of Destiny came in a basic version for beginners and a complete version for more advanced players. Jonathan Walton noted in a 1993 review in Paper Mayhem, a magazine for play-by-mail games, that Lords of Destiny was Maelstrom Games' first game, and that, although customer service had been good and the owner was a long-time play-by-mail gamer, the turn sheets were cluttered and required some improvements which had recently been made.

Gameplay
Lords of Destiny's central focus was on combat and alliances, although it was not focused on building an empire through gaining land or economic growth. Characters were a key aspect of the game, although players did not start with any characters. Characters included: admirals, diplomats, economists, heroes, generals, governors, psionics, scientists, and spies. "Legendary Characters", or "Lords of Destiny", were named after the game and had special abilities. They were achieved after a character became level 10 in a field, although there was only one Lord of Destiny possible per field per game. The game's Victory Conditions were primarily combat-related along with some being resource-related.

Reception
Lords of Destiny won the Origins Award for Best New Play-by-Mail Game of 1992. The game placed sixth in the Best Play By Mail Games of 1994 list in Paper Mayhem, a magazine for play by mail gamers. In 1993, reviewer Jonathan Walton opined that, although Lords of Destiny wasn't the most modern or innovative game, "Is it a good, solid, Play-By-Mail game that gives you an excellent value for your money? In my opinion, resoundingly YES."

Reviews
White Wolf Inphobia #55 (May, 1995)

See also
 List of play-by-mail games

References

Bibliography
 
 
 
 
 
 

Origins Award winners
Play-by-mail games